Bikash Roy (16 May 1916 – 16 April 1987) was an Indian actor and filmmaker who is known for his work in Bengali cinema. He is well known for his character roles and for his own style of acting in Bengali films from the late 1940s until the mid-1980s.

Early life and education
He was born in Kolkata, but his ancestral home was Madanpur, Nadia, West Bengal, India. Madanpur in the Nadia district. As a member of a rich and aristocratic family, he grew up in liberal surroundings. He first attended Mitra Institution for his matriculation. Then Roy graduated with a Bachelor's of Arts  from the University of Calcutta (Presidency College), and later earned a B.L (now it is called LL.B) from the same university.

Career

Acting in films
He acted in numerous films, including Ratnadeep, 42, Uttar Falguni, Surya Toran, Neel Akasher Neechey, Marutirtha Hinglaj, Jiban Kahini, Jiban Trishna, and Chhadmabeshi. In the early 1950s, he acted as Kamal, the protagonist in the romantic comedy Chheley Kaar and also as a funny grandfather in the 1980 comedy Ogo Bodhu Shundori, followed by similar roles during the end of his career. But what may be his most famous role was the character of the selfless barrister Manish, who is committed to his beloved, a courtesan (played by Suchitra Sen), in Uttar Falguni. He also did a number of radio plays for Akashvani and shot into fame after being cast in the role of a ruthless, tyrannic military officer in the film 42 that included stars like Abhi Bhattacharya, Manju Dey, and Sombhu Mitra among others as stalwarts. His acting prowess and versatility could be gauged in films like Ratnadeep, where he plays the role of an imposter who reforms himself, as the prodigal hero in Naa, as the strife-torn co-protagonist in Surjamukhi (which he also produced), as the affluent businessman who rose from the rags in Surya Toran, as a protagonist (opposite Uttam Kumar) who aspires to beat his rival but is torn within himself in Jiban Trishna, as a patriot in Masterda Surya Sen, as the patriarch in Kanch Kata Hirey, as a caring brother in Dhuli, as the quiet and intense husband in Smriti Tuku Thak (opposite Suchitra Sen who plays a double role), as the quarrelsome husband in Jatugriha (directed by Tapan Sinha and starring Uttam Kumar, Arundhati Devi, and Binota Roy), in Baghini as a police officer, in negative roles - Bibhas, Agni Sanskar, Jighansa, Adwitiya, Bhola Moira, and Karcher Swarga, as a compassionate and humorous doctor in Arohi, as a psychological patient in Andhar Periye (both directed by Tapan Sinha), as a quack in Ramer Sumati, as the elder brother and head of the family in Bindur Chheley, as the hapless and helpless father in Maya Mriga in the early 1960s, and as the proud and high-handed father in Devdas (starring Soumitra Chatterjee, Sumitra Mukherjee, Uttam Kumar, and Supriya Devi) in the late 1970s and so on.

One of the most prominent and best roles played by him was in Arogya Niketan, playing the cameo role of Moshay, an old village doctor who believes firmly in the Vedic way of medical practice, however, not being absolutely illogical and apartheid to modern medicine and the treatments associated with it. For this role, he happened to win the National Film Award for Best Feature Film in Bengali as well.

Acting in theatrical plays
His foray in commercial plays was commendable; most worth mentioning being Nahabat which ran for more than 1,200 nights. He pioneered the holding of stage-plays where the characters read out the play and their respective roles in front of the audience; known as "Shruti Natok" (audio drama). The most famous in this genre being Shesher Kobita and Chirakumar Sabha, based respectively on a novel and a play by Rabindranath Tagore. He also acted in a number of radio-plays on Akashvani/All India Radio (AIR), most notably Suk Sari (with Tripti Mitra) and Dui Bon.

Directing films
His love for the silver screen drove him to produce and direct a number of films like Marutirtha Hinglaj, Raja Saja (both featuring Uttam Kumar as the leading actor), Basant Bahar, Carey Saheber Munshi – a film based on the life and times of Ramram Basu (1757-1813), and Debotar Graash, based on a poem by Rabindranath Tagore.

Autobiography
He remained active well into the 1980s, gradually moving to cameo roles, owing to his failing health. He has few autobiographical titles to his credit - Mone Pore, Kichhu Chhabi, Kichhu Galpo, Prasanga Abhinoy, and Aami.

Selected filmography
 Abhiyatri
 42
 Masterda Surya Sen
 Bhuli Nai
 Chheley Kaar
 Ratnadeep
 Jighansa
 Taka Aana Pai
 Kirtigarh
 Naa
 Ratrir Tapasya
 Dhuli
 Shap Mochan
 Sajghar
 Abhoyer Biye
 Jiban Kahini
 Jiban Trishna
Indranath Srikanta O Annadadidi
 Agni Sanskar
 Marutirtha Hinglaj
 Gali Theke Rajpath
 Smriti Tuku Thak
 Surya Toran
 Bibhas
 Sesh Anka
 Neel Akasher Neechey
 Maya Mriga
 Raja Saja
 Karcher Swarga
 Rajdrohi
 Jatugriha
 Arogya Niketan
 Chhaya Surya
 Kanch Kata Hirey
 Uttar Falguni
 Shap Mochan
 Baghini
 Sabyasachi
 Hangsa Mithun
 Kalankita Nayak
 Prastar Swakshar
 Chhadmabeshi
 Mon Niye
 Arohi
 Har Mana Har
 Nabarag
 Alo Amar Alo
 Adwitiya
 Bon Palashir Padabali
 Megh Kalo
 Bhola Moira
 Bindur Chheley
 Ramer Sumati
 Dour
 Devdas
 Ogo Bodhu Shundori
 Shatru
 Na
 Amar Prithibi (last released film during his lifetime)

Awards
 BFJA Awards - Best Actor In Supporting Role for Uttar Falguni in 1964.
 BFJA Awards - Best Actor In Supporting Role for Kanch Kata Hirey in 1967.
 BFJA Awards - Best Actor In Supporting Role for Prastar Swakshar in 1968.

References
"Aami" by Bikash Roy.

External links

1916 births
1987 deaths
University of Calcutta alumni
Male actors in Bengali cinema
20th-century Indian male actors
People from British India